Minor league baseball teams were based in McLeansboro, Illinois. In 1910 and 1911, McLeansboro teams played as members of the 1910 Southern Illinois League and the Kentucky-Illinois-Tennessee League from 1910 to 1911, winning two league championships in 1910. McLeansboro hosted home minor league games at Fairgrounds Park.

History
The McLeansboro Merchants began minor league play in 1910, a season that saw the team win championships in two different leagues. The McLeansboro franchise was a charter member when the Southern Illinois League was formed for the 1910 season as a five–team Class D level league. The Southern Illinois League began play on May 30, 1910, with the charter franchises Eldorado, Illinois team, Harrisburg Merchants, Herrin, Illinois team and Mount Vernon Merchants joining McLeansboro in league play.

The Southern Illinois League permanently folded on July 11, 1910. The McLeansboro Merchants were in first place when the league shut down.
In the final 1910 standings, the McLeansboro Merchants were in 1st place with a 20–5 record when the Southern Illinois League folded. Playing under manager Ollie Gfroerer, McLeansboro finished 6.5 games ahead of Eldorado (14–12). They were followed by Herrin (8–11), the Mount Vernon Merchants (8–11) and Harrisburg Merchants (6–17) in the final standings.

McLeansboro immediately continued play in 1910 and won a second championship under manager Ollie Gfroerer. The franchise became members of the Class D level Kentucky-Illinois-Tennessee League (KITTY League) at the half–way point of the season. They were joined by the Harrisburg Merchants in moving to the Kitty League. The newly named McLeansboro Billikens had a record of 40–18 in the second half of the split–season schedule and won the second half title. There were no playoffs held, with McLeansboro and the Vincennes Alices, who won the first half title, being declared Co–Champions. McLeansboro's Clarence Kraft led the team with a .292 average and his 4 homers tied for the league lead. He also led the league with a 13–2 record as a pitcher.

In 1911, the team was renamed the McLeansboro Miners as they continued play in the Kentucky-Illinois–Tennessee–League. On June 20, 1911, after compiling a 19–15 record, McLeansboro moved to Henderson, Kentucky. The move was made in part because McLeansboro did not permit Sunday baseball and the team became the Henderson Hens after the move. The McLeansboro/Henderson team ended the 1911 season with a 65–58 overall record, placing 3rd in the Kentucky-Illinois–Tennessee–League. The managers were Miles Bradshaw and John Stelle.

McLeansboro, Illinois has not hosted another minor league team.

The ballpark
The McLeansboro teams played minor league home games at Fairgrounds Park. The ballpark was located at the Hamilton County Fairgrounds. Today, the fairgrounds are still in use as home to the Hamilton County Fair. The address is 808 West Randolph Street.

Timeline

Year–by–year records

Notable alumni
George Beck (1910)
Clarence Kraft (1910)

See also
McLeansboro Merchants playersMcLeansboro Billikens players

References

External links
Baseball Reference

Hamilton County, Illinois